Toong Sanaeha is a Thai TV drama based on the novel in the same title of Chulamanee. The first and only season aired on Channel 3 from February 16 to March 29, 2020, on every Friday from 8:30 pm to 10:30 pm, Saturday and Sunday from 8:30 pm to 10:25 pm, for 19 episodes.

It reruns the first episode on Saturday October 9, 2021 at the original time on Channel 3.

Plot 
The story takes place in the years 1972–1978, about the love story of the young people of Nong Namphueng County, Nakhon Sawan Province, where the path of love is not strewn with rose petals, even love so dear but had to succumb to the fact that life is full of uncertainty.

Cast

Main 
Jarinporn Joonkiat as Yupin
Denkhun Ngamnet as Mingkwan
Butsakorn Wongpuapan as Samphao
Jaron Sorat as Paitoon
Thunyaphat Pattarateerachaicharoen as Kaewjai, Yupin's junior friend and Praiwan's sidekick

Supporting 
Tanin Manoonsilp as Praiwan
Paswitch Boorananut as Captain Niphat
Rinrada Kaewbuasai as Janthon
Eisaya Hosuwan as Jinda
Sorachut Sahadtanachai as Jamriang
Natthachai Sirinanthachot as Ko, Praiwan's stooge and Samphao's employee
Ponganan Wangsittidej as Jon, Praiwan's stooge and Samphao's employee
Krittawat Chaodee as Sa, Praiwan's stooge and Samphao's employee
Ratree Wittawat as Sali
Chanokchon Chamnan as Manao
Nattida Pitakworarat as Som
Nai Sooksakul as Boonyuen, Yupin's father
Arisara Wongchalee as Thongyot, Yupin's mother
Sippothai Chantasiriwat as Sooksamue, Yupin's beautician friend
Wattikorn Permsubhirun as Surat (Kuang), Mingkwan's Thai-Chinese conscript friend
Latkamon Pinrojkirati as Panwat, naughty girl who courts Surat
Ampha Phoosit as Thanom, Panwat's mother
Krit Autthaseree as Colonel Sombat, Niphat's commander
Daraneenuch Photipiti as Madam Jongjit, Sombat's wife
Duanghathai Satthathip as Madam Nirobon, Niphat's mother
Surasit Chaiat as Lieutenant General Nisit, Niphat's father
Kaew Korravee as Niraporn, Niphat's older sister
Nitwara Inchu as Nichapan, Niphat's older sister and Niraporn's younger sister
Nino Sudtheerak as Phatai Thepthong, likay dancer who seduces Kaewjai
Rungjaras Khammi as Duangmanee Srinakorn, likay dancer, Phatai Thepthong's jealous wife
Klos Utthaseri as Xiamtiang, Surat's father
Prima Ratchata as Zoktiang, Surat's mother
Kasama Nitsaiphan as Mon, Mingkwan's father
Santi Sativekakul as Kon, Kaewjai's father
Rong Kaomulkadee as Pastor Klam
Krittapas Sakdistano as Sergeant Somyot, Yupin's older brother
Khakkingrak Khikkhiksaranang as Nongnart, Somyot's wife and Yupin's sister-in-law
Sopitsuda Ittimatin as Yupa, Yupin's older sister

Special appearances 
Tanongsak Supakan as Headman Piak
Veeraphon Chantrong as Drillmaster
Janet Khiew as Pranom, in charge of sporting house
Adam Semar as Bob, G.I. later Kaewjai's husband
Pattarakorn Tangsupakul as Salakjit (Kimtiang), Surat's fiancée
Jirawat Wachirasarunpat as Salakjit's father, the wealthy of Nakhon Sawan
Lorena Schuett as Captain Srikanya WRTA
Thanupong Sakthanawat as singing contest MC
Wuttiwat Thitijarasthanachot as Nui of Koei Chai, Yupa's husband and Yupin's brother-in-law

Awards & nominations

Sequel 
Watsanarak is a sequel, the story of ascendancy, which is the story of the children's generation.

References

External links 
 

2020 Thai television series debuts
2020 Thai television series endings
Channel 3 (Thailand) original programming
Television series set in the 1970s
Thai drama television series